Kevin Walsh (11 February 1928 – June 2012) was an English footballer who played as a wing half in the Football League.

References

External links

1928 births
2012 deaths
English footballers
Footballers from Rochdale
Association football midfielders
Oldham Athletic A.F.C. players
Southport F.C. players
Bradford City A.F.C. players
Mossley A.F.C. players
English Football League players